The Men's 200 Individual Medley (or "I.M.") swimming event at the 2009 SEA Games was held on December 11, 2009.

Results

Final

Preliminary heats

References

Swimming at the 2009 Southeast Asian Games